Matthew Orsini (died after January 1238) or Maio Orsini was a Count palatine of Cephalonia and Zakynthos.

Life 
Matthew's origin is obscure. He is generally considered the scion of the noble Roman Orsini family, and according to the—mostly conjectured—genealogy presented by the 19th-century scholar Karl Hopf, was the son of a certain Richard Orsini and a daughter of admiral Margaritus of Brindisi, who had conquered the Byzantine islands of Cephalonia, Zakynthos, and Ithaca during the Third Norman invasion of the Balkans in 1185. Other scholars on the other hand have considered him Margaritus' son-in-law. In both cases, it is considered that he succeeded Margaritus in his rule over Cephalonia, Zakynthos, and Ithaca, following the latter's disgrace in 1194. Like Margaritus, Matthew acknowledged the suzerainty of the Norman Kings of Sicily.

More recent research has cast doubt on this traditional account: Matthew was most likely from Monopoli in Apulia, and appears to have been unrelated to Margaritus. Even his surname, Orsini, is only attested for his descendants and not himself, and it remains unclear how it became associated with his family. The Aragonese version of the Chronicle of the Morea offers an alternative background, reporting that Maio had been expelled from Monopoli, fled to Cephalonia, and married the daughter of the local Byzantine governor before extending his rule over the neighbouring islands. While previous scholars dismissed this version, it may have been closer to reality according to the historian Andreas Kiesewetter. Kiesewetter suggests that Matthew became master of the islands as late as 1206, following the collapse of the Byzantine Empire due to the Fourth Crusade in 1204.

Following the partition of the Byzantine Empire by the participants of the Fourth Crusade in 1204, the Ionian Islands, including those ruled by Matthew, were assigned to the Republic of Venice. In 1205, Venice proceeded to occupy Corfu, the largest of the Ionian Islands, which was ruled by the Genoese pirate . To insure himself against a similar fate, in 1207 Matthew placed himself and his domains under the authority of Pope Innocent III. Two years later, however, Matthew accommodated himself with Venice, acknowledging the Republic's suzerainty. However, this information is reported by Venetian chroniclers of the 14th and 15th centuries, so that its veracity is unverifiable; at any rate, as Kiesewetter notes, the Venetian loss of Corfu in 1210 would have made any Venetian connection less attractive to Matthew. Indeed, it appears that during the same period he placed himself under the suzerainty of the Latin Empire of Constantinople. After the death of Emperor Henry of Flanders in 1216, he sought protection from the Pope, while at the same time seeking close relations with Theodore Komnenos Doukas, the neighbouring Greek ruler of the Epirote mainland. These ties between the two were strengthened by the marriage of Matthew to a sister of Theodore in 1227.
 
Following the defeat of Theodore at Klokotnitsa in 1230, which spelled an end to his imperial ambitions, in 1236 Matthew became a vassal of the Principality of Achaea instead. 

The last record of Matthew is a letter sent to him by Pope Gregory IX in January 1238, exhorting him to come to the defence of Constantinople against the Greeks of the Empire of Nicaea. Count Richard Orsini is often considered his son and successor, but this is problematic for chronological reasons. It is likely that Matthew was succeeded by another person, possibly named Theodore, who would then be the father of Richard.

References

Bibliography 
 
 
 

12th-century births
12th-century rulers in Europe
13th-century deaths
13th-century rulers in Europe
Matthew
Matthew
People from Apulia